Leucosoleniidae is a family of calcareous sponges in the order Leucosolenida.

References

Taxonomicon

Leucosolenida